Joseph Abbott  (August 1843 – 15 June 1903) was a wool-broker and politician in New South Wales.

Career
Abbott was an auctioneer of wool, chief auctioneer and a partner and managing director of Mort & Co. Ltd. Abbott was elected to the seat of Newtown in the New South Wales Legislative Assembly in a by-election in February 1888. Abbott held the seat and won the election in July when the seat was reformed as the Electoral district of Newtown-Camperdown. Abbott retired from politics in July 1895. He died in Croydon, New South Wales on 15 June 1903.

Family
On his death he was survived by his widow, six sons and three daughters. All his sons were educated at Newington College. George Henry Abbott (1867–1942), became a medical practitioner, lectured in clinical surgery at the Royal Prince Alfred Hospital in 1911–27, was a founding fellow of the Royal Australian College of Surgeons, and a councillor and later president of the New South Wales branch of the British Medical Association. He was also a keen numismatist, sometime president of the Royal Australian Historical Society and fellow of the University of Sydney Senate. Joseph Sydney Abbott (1869–1957), followed in his father's steps, and was for many years a partner in the firm of Wright & Abbott, wool scourers, brokers and commission agents. Arthur Edgar Abbott (1876–1960), studied law and was admitted to the Bar in 1900. He initially became a partner in Lambton, Milford & Abbott but in 1909 he retired from that firm and became a partner in Garland, Seaborne and Abbott. From 1947 until 1949 he was president of The Incorporated Law Institute of New South Wales.

References

 

1843 births
1903 deaths
Members of the New South Wales Legislative Assembly
People from Parramatta
Australian auctioneers
19th-century Australian politicians
19th-century Australian businesspeople
Australian numismatists